2018 Yokohama F. Marinos season.

Squad
As of 2019.

The official club website lists the club mascot as player #0 and the supporters as player #12.

Out on loan

J1 League

References

External links
 J.League official site

Yokohama F. Marinos
Yokohama F. Marinos seasons